α-Muurolene synthase (EC 4.2.3.125, Cop3) is an enzyme with systematic name (2E,6E)-farnesyl-diphosphate diphosphate-lyase (cyclizing, α-muurolene-forming). This enzyme catalyses the following chemical reaction

 (2E,6E)-farnesyl diphosphate  α-muurolene + diphosphate

The enzyme has been characterized from the fungus Coprinus cinereus.

References

External links 
 

EC 4.2.3